The 2015–16 Equatoguinean Primera División season is the top level of competition in Equatorial Guinea. It began on 12 September 2015 and concluded on 19 July 2016.

First stage

Región Continental

Región Insular

Top Four

Región Continental

Región Insular

Liguilla Nacional

Semi-finals

Final
Sony Ela Nguema 0-0 Vegetarianos    [3-2 pen]

References

Football leagues in Equatorial Guinea
Premier League
Premier League
Equatorial Guinea